Lincoln/Cypress station is an elevated light rail station on the L Line of the Los Angeles Metro Rail system. It is located above Avenue 26 between Artesian Street and Lacy Street in the Lincoln Heights and Cypress Park neighborhoods of Los Angeles, and next to the line's crossing of Interstate 5 This station opened on July 26, 2003, as part of the original Gold Line, then known as the "Pasadena Metro Blue Line" project. This station and all the other original and Foothill Extension stations will be part of the A Line upon completion of the Regional Connector project in 2023.

The station features a free park-and-ride lot.

Service

Station layout

Hours and frequency

Connections 
, the following connections are available:
Los Angeles Metro Bus:

Station artwork
A site-specific installation artwork, titled "Water Street: River of Dreams" by artist Cheri Gaulke, has visual references to metaphorically connect the Tongva people (Gabrieliño Indians) who once inhabited the area with a contemporary flowing landscape. A life-size bronze sculpture is of a Tongva woman drawing water from the imaginary river and pouring it into a tightly woven bronze basket.

Previous station names
During the construction and planning stages, Lincoln/Cypress station was originally planned to be named Avenue 26 station, named for nearby Avenue 26. It was one of three stations to be renamed shortly before the line's opening.  It was then renamed Lincoln Heights/Cypress Park to reflect the neighborhoods that are served by the station.  Metro now refers to the station using the shorter "Lincoln/Cypress".

References

External links

L Line (Los Angeles Metro) stations
Cypress Park, Los Angeles
Metro
Arroyo Seco (Los Angeles County)
Northeast Los Angeles
Railway stations in the United States opened in 2003
2003 establishments in California